The Flying Machines FM301 Stream, is a Czech ultralight trike, designed by and produced by Flying Machines s.r.o. of Rasošky. The aircraft is supplied as a complete ready-to-fly-aircraft.

Design and development
It features a cable-braced hang glider-style high-wing, weight-shift controls, a two-seats-in-tandem open cockpit with a cockpit fairing, tricycle landing gear and a single engine in pusher configuration.

The aircraft is made with a monocoque fibreglass carriage, with its double surface wing covered in Dacron sailcloth. Its  span Quasar wing is supported by a single tube-type kingpost and uses an "A" frame weight-shift control bar. The powerplant is a twin cylinder, air-cooled, four-stroke, dual-ignition  HKS 700E engine, with the two-stroke  Rotax 582 and the four cylinder, air and liquid-cooled, four-stroke, dual-ignition  Rotax 912UL or  Rotax 912ULS engines optional.

The unusual fibreglass structural construction allows internal fuel tanks and also permits a large unobstructed baggage area. The FM301 also has a unique wing mast system that allows the wing to be assembled and mounted on the carriage single-handedly.

Specifications (FM301)

References

External links

2000s Czech sport aircraft
2000s Czech ultralight aircraft
Single-engined pusher aircraft
Ultralight trikes